Eurofurence (commonly abbreviated EF) is a furry convention held in changing places in Europe every year (in Berlin, Germany since 2014 and will remain there for the time being). It was originally started in 1995 as a private gathering by nineteen European furry fans who met on the Internet. Attendance has been steadily rising since then, to 3,495 at Eurofurence 26 (held in 2022), making it the largest furry convention outside the United States. The name of the convention derives from its American back-then-counterpart ConFurence, emphasising the European nature of the gathering.

Since the year 2000, Eurofurence is no longer organized by individual persons but rather by the German Verein Eurofurence e.V., which serves as an administrative body for the convention.

Contrary to most American furry conventions, Eurofurence traditionally took place at youth hostels. In 2007, Eurofurence was first held at a hotel (the Hotel Ringberg in Suhl).

Eurofurence by year 
Below is a table of statistics regarding each year Eurofurence has been held. Since 1999 (possibly except for 6 and 9), the convention has had at least one guest of honour yearly. Since 2002, the convention has had a "theme" every year, with T-shirt designs and venue "dressing" to reflect the theme.

Main events 
Pawpet show - Furry handpuppet story with custom plot, music and effects
 Enter the Arena - Fursuit dance contest
 Big Blue Dance - Disco with live DJ, light effects and live mixed background animations
 Group Photo
 Fursuit parade
 Art Auction - Bidding for art
 Dealers' Den - Possibility to sell/buy merchandise and art
 DDR Tournament

References

External links 

 

Furry conventions
Recurring events established in 1995